is a passenger railway station located in the city of Isumi, Chiba Prefecture Japan, operated by the East Japan Railway Company (JR East).

Lines

Station layout
The station consists of a single island platform and a single side platform serving three tracks, connected to a white-washed station building by a footbridge. The station is staffed.

Platform

History
Taitō Station was opened on 13 December 1899 as a station on the Bōsō Railway. On 1 September 1907, the Bōsō Railway was nationalized and became part of the Japanese Government Railways, which was transformed into the Japanese National Railways (JNR) after World War II. The station was absorbed into the JR East network upon the privatization of the Japan National Railways on 1 April 1987.

Passenger statistics
In fiscal 2019, the station was used by an average of 436 passengers daily (boarding passengers only).

See also
 List of railway stations in Japan

References

External links

 JR East Station information 

Railway stations in Japan opened in 1899
Railway stations in Chiba Prefecture
Sotobō Line
Isumi